The judo competition at the 1973 Southeast Asian Peninsular Games was held between 4 to 7 September at Chung Cheng High School.

Medal summary

Men

Medal table

References

External links
 
 
 

1973 Southeast Asian Peninsular Games
1973
Asian Games, Southeast
1973 Asian Games, Southeast